Sébastien Dockier (born 28 December 1989) is a Belgian field hockey player who plays for Dutch club Pinoké and the Belgium national team as a forward.

Dockier comes from a real hockey family; not only his father and sister but even aunts and cousins have been playing field hockey.

Club career
During his youth, he played for Royal Beerschot THC, where he played in the first team until 2014, when he left to play for Dutch club HC Den Bosch. After three seasons with Den Bosch, he went back to his former club. He played there for one season before returning to the Netherlands to play for Den Bosch again. In June 2020, he left Den Bosch and joined Pinoké for the 2020–21 season.

International career
He became European vice-champion with Belgium at the 2013 EuroHockey Championships on home ground in Boom and at the 2017 EuroHockey Championships in Amstelveen, Netherlands. He was a part of the Belgian squad which won the silver medal at the 2016 Summer Olympics. He was selected for the 2018 World Cup, which was his second World Cup. On 25 May 2021, he was selected in the squad for the 2021 EuroHockey Championship.

References

External links

1989 births
Living people
Belgian male field hockey players
Male field hockey forwards
2014 Men's Hockey World Cup players
Field hockey players at the 2016 Summer Olympics
Field hockey players at the 2020 Summer Olympics
2018 Men's Hockey World Cup players
Olympic field hockey players of Belgium
Olympic silver medalists for Belgium
Olympic medalists in field hockey
Medalists at the 2016 Summer Olympics
HC Den Bosch players
People from Bonheiden
Royal Beerschot THC players
Men's Belgian Hockey League players
Men's Hoofdklasse Hockey players
Olympic gold medalists for Belgium
Medalists at the 2020 Summer Olympics
Sportspeople from Antwerp Province
2023 Men's FIH Hockey World Cup players